The Acropolis International Tournament 2008 was a basketball tournament held in OAKA Indoor Hall in Athens, Greece, from July 7 until July 9, 2008. This was the 22nd edition of the Acropolis International Basketball Tournament. The four participating teams were Greece, Croatia, Brazil and Australia.

Venues

Participating teams

Final standing

References

External links
Basket.gr Acropolis Cup History Search Results 

Acropolis International Basketball Tournament
2007–08 in Greek basketball
2007–08 in Australian basketball
2007–08 in Brazilian basketball
2007–08 in Croatian basketball